Rab9 effector protein with Kelch motifs also known as p40 is a protein that in humans is encoded by the RABEPK gene.

Membrane-associated p40, in together with RAB9A, facilitates the transport of the mannose 6-phosphate receptor (MPR) from endosomes to the trans-Golgi network.

Interactions
RABEPK has been shown to interact with RAB9A and FYVE finger-containing phosphoinositide kinase.

References

Further reading

External links
 
 

Kelch proteins